NCAA Season 96 is the 2020–21 athletic year of the National Collegiate Athletic Association in the Philippines. The season host is the Colegio de San Juan de Letran, coincidentally also celebrating its 400th anniversary.

Background
Due to the COVID-19 pandemic in Metro Manila, the preceding season, NCAA Season 95, was terminated. This meant tournaments that were ongoing or have not been started were all canceled. No championships were decided on canceled tournaments, and no general champions were named. The Management Committee has recommended on starting the athletic year in November, instead of the usual July schedule, with President Rodrigo Duterte moving the start of the academic year to September.

This is also the first season where foreigners are banned from playing.

After UAAP Season 83 was cancelled, the NCAA insisted on going through with its season.

On May 14, 2021, it was reported that Martin Javier and Sophia Senoron was to host the season. The opening ceremony was held virtually on June 13, 2021. Originally set for May, it was postponed to June 13 following the surge of COVID-19 cases in the country as well as the placement of the NCR+ under enhanced community quarantine.

No championships involving contact sports, including the basketball and volleyball, would be held. Holding games under the bubble format was considered for basketball and volleyball but such plans did not push through.

Basketball 

The season also had basketball tournaments but it was a skills showdown featuring Martin Antonio teaching the skills. It featured San Beda's Radge Tongco, San Sebastian's Ian Valdez, EAC's Jethro Mendoza, Benilde's Kendrix Belgica, Lyceum's Kim Cinco, Arellano's Leonard Anquillo, Perpetual's Gerald Dizon, Letran's Mark Cruz and JRU's Justin Padua to show their skills. Its skills were shooting stars and dribble and shoot.

References

Legend:

(C) = Champion

(SFL) = Semifinals Loser

(SFW) = Semifinals Winner

(FL) = Finals Loser

(H) = Host

Chess

Seniors' tournament

Results

Bracket

Taekwondo

Men's tournament

Women's tournament

Juniors' tournament

Media 

Due to the dissolution of ABS-CBN Sports and the denial of the new franchise of ABS-CBN by the House of Representatives, the NCAA had to find a new broadcast partner since its media partner's denial of franchise. On November 19, 2020, NCAA signed a 5-year deal with GMA Network that will cover seasons 96 to 101.

References

See also
UAAP Season 83

2020 in multi-sport events
2020 in Philippine sport
2021 in multi-sport events
2021 in Philippine sport
National Collegiate Athletic Association (Philippines) seasons
Colegio de San Juan de Letran